is a railway station on the Kashii Line operated by JR Kyushu in Kasuya, Fukuoka Prefecture, Japan.

Lines

Station layout 
The station, which is unstaffed, consists of a side platform serving a single track. A station building shares facilities with a community facilities called the "Harmony Hall" and houses a small waiting area and automatic ticket machines. A siding branches off the track and is used by track maintenance vehicles. Beside the siding are the traces of a disused freight platform.

Adjacent stations

History
On 1 October 1908, the name was changed to Iga. On 19 September 1942, the company, now renamed the Hakata Bay Railway and Steamship Company, with a few other companies, merged into the Kyushu Electric Tramway. Three days later, the new conglomerate, which had assumed control of the station, became the Nishi-Nippon Railroad (Nishitetsu). Japanese Government Railways (JGR) took over control of the station and the track which served it was designated the Kashii Line. With the privatization of Japanese National Railways (JNR), the successor of JGR, on 1 April 1987, JR Kyushu took over control of the station. When a new station located next on the line was opened in 1988, the old name of Chōjabaru was given to it.

On 14 March 2015, the station, along with others on the line, became a remotely managed "Smart Support Station". Under this scheme, although the station became unstaffed, passengers using the automatic ticket vending machines or ticket gates could receive assistance via intercom from staff at a central support centre.

Passenger statistics
In fiscal 2016, the station was used by an average of 740 passengers daily (boarding passengers only), and it ranked 198th among the busiest stations of JR Kyushu.

References

External links
Iga (JR Kyushu)

Railway stations in Fukuoka Prefecture
Railway stations in Japan opened in 1904